The Ministry of Commerce, Industry & Investment Promotion is the governmental body in the Sultanate of Oman responsible for regulating commerce and industries.

See also
 List of company registers

External links 
 

Government of Oman